Q is a novel by Luther Blissett first published in Italian in 1999. The novel is set in Europe during the 16th century, and deals with Protestant reformation movements.

"Luther Blissett" was a nom de plume for four Italian authors (Roberto Bui, Giovanni Cattabriga, Federico Guglielmi and Luca Di Meo) who were part of the "Luther Blissett Project",  which ended in 1999. They now write under the name Wu Ming.

The novel has been translated into Danish, Dutch, English (British and American), French, German, Greek, Korean, Lithuanian, Polish, Russian, Turkish, Basque, Czech, Portuguese, Spanish and Serbian. All of the editions keep the original copyright statement, which allows the non-commercial reproduction of the book.

Plot
The book follows the journey of an Anabaptist radical across Europe in the first half of the 16th century as he joins in various movements and uprisings that come as a result of the Protestant reformation. The book spans 30 years as he is pursued by 'Q' (short for "Qoèlet"), a spy for the Roman Catholic Church cardinal Giovanni Pietro Carafa. The main character, who changes his name many times during the story, first fights in the German Peasants' War beside Thomas Müntzer, during which time he takes part in negotiations which are eventually formalised as the Twelve Articles. Following this, he battles in Münster's siege, during the Münster Rebellion, and some years later, in Venice.

Interpretations and controversy
Throughout Europe, several critics have read Q from a political point of view, and maintain that the novel is an allegory of European society after the decline of the 1960s and 1970s protest movements. As in the 16th century, the Counter-Reformation repressed any alternative theological current or radical social movement, and the Peace of Augsburg sanctioned the partition of the continent among Catholic and Protestant powers, so the last twenty years of the 20th century were marked by a vengeful rebirth of conservative ideologies, and the International Monetary Fund-driven corporate globalization of the economy seemed to rout any resistance.

This interpretation stems from the authors describing Q as a "handbook of survival skills", which might cast a revealing light on the book's ending. But, this is just one of the many interpretations that have emerged following publication.

According to other readers and critics, Q is a thinly disguised autobiography of Luther Blissett as a subversive, identity-shifting collective phantom. The protagonist has no name (the authors later renamed themselves Wu Ming, which is Chinese for "no name"), is involved in every tumult of the age, incites the people to rebellion, and organizes hoaxes, swindles and mischievous acts.

Both British novelist Stewart Home and American novelist David Liss have interpreted Q as an "anti-novel", although their respective analyses come to different conclusions. While Home's review emphasized the social, political and subcultural references embedded in the plot, Liss' review dismissed the book as unnecessary and self-referential.

Other readers have suggested that Q — apart from radicalism, post-modernism, and allegories — is above all an adventure novel, a swashbuckler in the very Italian tradition of Emilio Salgari and other popular feuilleton authors.

In 2018, a reporter for BuzzFeed News suggested that the right-wing "QAnon" conspiracy theory shared many similarities to plot points in the novel.

Film adaptation
Rumours about a potential film adaptation of Q have circulated since the mid-2000s. On December 9 2007, the British newspaper The Observer published a lengthy interview with Radiohead in which Thom Yorke stated: 
"Oh it's fucking ace! But my missus, that's her specialist field, so she's been explaining it to me all the way through. Medieval church carnage. It's mental. I want to get it made into a film. That's my next mission." The interviewer asked: "Using the In Rainbows profits?", to which Yorke replied: "I doubt it. That would cover basically the catering."

On January 21, 2011, the Italian producer Domenico Procacci optioned Q to make a movie and commissioned the screenplay for the film to Giaime Alonge and Alessandro Scippa. Procacci's production company, Fandango, was planning a co-production with other countries.

Altai: a "return to Q "

In May 2009 Wu Ming announced that they had almost finished writing a new book, set "in [their debut novel] Q's world and historical continuum". They announced it would be published in Italy in the Fall of 2009. Later on, they revealed that the title would be Altai and explained:

Historical characters and events
German Peasants' War
 Thomas Müntzer – Reformation pastor and Anabaptist;
 Martin Bucer – Protestant reformer;
 Wolfgang Fabricius Capito – German reformer;
 Martin Borrhaus (Cellarius) – Unitarianist reformer;
 15 May 1525 - Battle of Frankenhausen
 Hans Hut Anabaptist bookseller

Münster Rebellion
 Jan van Leiden – Münster rebellion Anabaptist leader and King
 Jan Matthys – anabaptist leader and alleged prophet
 Melchior Hoffman – Anabaptist prophet
 Bernhard Rothmann – Anabaptist theologian
 Franz von Waldeck – prince-bishop of Münster and army chief in the siege of the city
 Bernhard Knipperdolling – guild leader in Münster city council and Anabaptist leader
 Bernhard Krechting – guild leader in Münster city council and Anabaptist leader
 Heinrich Krechting
 Heinrich Gresbeck
 John Trypmaker

Antwerp
 Jan van Batenburg – revolutionary Anabaptist;
 Anton Fugger – banker
 Eloi Pruystinck – Reformation leader

Venice
 João Miquez – merchant
 Spirituali
 Giovanni Pietro Carafa – cardinal, later Pope Paul IV
 Reginald Pole – cardinal

Editions
The following are printed editions. Downloadable online editions in several languages can be found here.
 Basque: Gatazka Kolektiboa, 2009, 
 Czech: Dokořán, 2006, 
 Danish: Hovedland, 2002, 
 Dutch: Wereldbibliotheek, 2001, 
 English: Heinemann, 2003,  Harcourt, 2004,  Arrow, 2004, 
 French: Seuil, 2001, with the title L'œil de Carafa
 German: Piper, 2002, 
 Greek: Travlos, 2001, 
 Italian: Einaudi, 1999, 
 Japanese: Tokyosogensha, 2014, 
 Korean: Saemulgyeol, 2006, 
 Polish: Albatros, 2005, 
 Portuguese (Brazilian): Conrad, 2002, 
 Russian: Machaon, 2006, 
 Serbian: Plato, 2010, 
 Spanish: Grijalbo/Mondadori, 2000, 
 Turkish: Everest Yayinlari, 2015,

See also

Wu Ming
54
Manituana
New Italian Epic

Notes

External links
 Authors' official website
 Download of Q and other works by same authors
 Alleged speech anachronisms in Q - The author's reply (2004).
 A list of reviews in several languages
 A list of reviews and ordering information
 Longlisted for the Guardian First Book Award 2003

1999 novels
Italian historical novels
Novels set in the Reformation
Creative Commons-licensed novels
Anabaptism
Collaborative novels
Novels set in the Renaissance
Heinemann (publisher) books
Thomas Müntzer
Works published under a pseudonym